The Coolidge House is a historic house at 820 Perry Street in Helena, Arkansas.  It is a -story wood-frame structure, built in 1880 by S. C. Moore as a wedding present for his daughter, Anna Leslie Moore, and Charles Coolidge, Jr.  It is an excellent local example of Queen Anne styling, with numerous gables projecting from its steeply hipped and busy roof line.  The porch extends partly across the front (south) before wrapping around to the west; it has sawn brackets and a spindled frieze, with a pedimented gable above the stairs.

The house was listed on the National Register of Historic Places in 1983.

See also
National Register of Historic Places listings in Phillips County, Arkansas

References

Houses on the National Register of Historic Places in Arkansas
Queen Anne architecture in Arkansas
Houses completed in 1880
Houses in Phillips County, Arkansas
National Register of Historic Places in Phillips County, Arkansas
Historic district contributing properties in Arkansas